Joseph Fernand Léon Rochefort (born May 4, 1939) is a Canadian former professional ice hockey centreman who spent 15 seasons in the National Hockey League playing for seven clubs in a career that lasted from 1959 to 1976. A hard-working journeyman, he won the Stanley Cup with the Montreal Canadiens in 1966 and 1971.

Playing career
Rochefort was born in Cap-de-la-Madeleine, Quebec. He came up through the junior system of the New York Rangers, playing for the Guelph Biltmores alongside future Hall of Famers Rod Gilbert and Jean Ratelle. He turned pro in 1959, and made his NHL debut in 1960–61 appearing in a single game for the Rangers. In 1962–63, he appeared in 23 games for the Rangers, recording 5 goals and 9 points.

Prior to the 1963–64 campaign, Rochefort was dealt to the Montreal Canadiens in a seven-player trade involving star goaltenders Jacques Plante and Gump Worsley. He would find it difficult to crack the powerful Montreal roster, spending most of the next three years with the Quebec Aces of the American Hockey League and appearing in just 11 games in Montreal over that span. However, he was called up to the team for the 1966 playoffs and appeared in 4 games, recording a goal and an assist, as Montreal won the Stanley Cup. He would build on that success the following year, spending most of the 1966–67 season in Montreal, notching 9 goals and 7 assists in 27 games.

Rochefort was claimed by the Philadelphia Flyers in the 1967 NHL Expansion Draft, and in Philadelphia was finally able to establish himself as a full-time NHL player. He would have his finest NHL season in 1967–68, leading the Flyers with 21 goals and finishing 3rd in overall scoring with 42 points. He would have another solid year in 1968–69, finishing 5th on Philadelphia with 35 points, but was dealt to the Los Angeles Kings at the conclusion of the season in a deal for enforcer Reggie Fleming. He spent a single season in Los Angeles, and led the team in assists although the team struggled to a last-place finish.

For the 1970–71 season, Rochefort was re-acquired by the Canadiens. He finished the year with just 5 goals and was briefly dispatched to the AHL, but appeared in 10 playoff games as Montreal again won the Stanley Cup. Following the season, he was dealt to the Detroit Red Wings, where he had a bounce-back year to finish with 17 goals and 28 points. Early in the 1972–73 season, he was dealt again, this time to the expansion Atlanta Flames where he would be a stabilizing influence in the team's first two NHL seasons.

Prior to the 1974–75 season, Rochefort was sold to the Vancouver Canucks, who would be his seventh NHL team. At the age of 35, he turned in one of the best seasons of his career, notching 18 goals - good for 5th on the team - and 29 points, and was a valuable veteran influence on a Canuck team which would win their division for the first time in their history. However, he was sent to the minors after a sluggish start to the following year, and he retired from the sport in 1976.

Rochefort finished his career with totals of 121 goals and 147 assists for 268 points in 617 NHL games, along with just 93 penalty minutes.

Rochefort is the uncle of Normand Rochefort, who spent 13 seasons as an NHL defender between 1980 and 1994.

Career statistics

Regular season and playoffs

Awards
 1966 and 1971 Stanley Cup Champion (Montreal)
 Led Philadelphia Flyers in goals during their inaugural season (1967–68)

External links
 

1939 births
Living people
Atlanta Flames players
Baltimore Clippers players
Canadian ice hockey centres
Detroit Red Wings players
Guelph Biltmore Mad Hatters players
Ice hockey people from Quebec
Kitchener Beavers (EPHL) players
Los Angeles Kings players
Montreal Canadiens players
Montreal Voyageurs players
National Hockey League All-Stars
New York Rangers players
Philadelphia Flyers players
Quebec Aces (AHL) players
Sportspeople from Trois-Rivières
Stanley Cup champions
Trois-Rivières Lions (EPHL) players
Tulsa Oilers (1964–1984) players
Vancouver Canucks players